Polyvagal theory (poly- "many" + vagal "wandering") is a collection of unproven, evolutionary, neuroscientific, and psychological constructs pertaining to the role of the vagus nerve in emotion regulation, social connection and fear response, introduced in 1994 by Stephen Porges. 

It is popular among some clinical practitioners and patients, but is not endorsed by current social neuroscience. 

Polyvagal theory takes its name from the vagus, a cranial nerve that forms the primary component of the parasympathetic nervous system. The traditional view of the autonomic nervous system presents a two-part system: the sympathetic nervous system, which is more activating ("fight or flight"), and the parasympathetic nervous system, which supports health, growth, and restoration ("rest and digest"). Polyvagal theory identifies a third type of nervous system response – the 'social engagement system', a hybrid state of activation and calming that plays a role in our ability to socially engage (or not).

Polyvagal theory views the parasympathetic nervous system as being split into two distinct branches: a "ventral vagal system" which supports social engagement, and a "dorsal vagal system" which supports immobilisation behaviours, both "rest and digest" and defensive immobilisation or "shutdown". Polyvagal theory was introduced by behavioral neuroscientist, Stephen W. Porges, in his presidential address to the Society of Psychophysiological Research in Atlanta, Georgia on October 8, 1994. 

The talk was later published in Psychophysiology 32 (1995) with the title "Orienting in a defensive world: Mammalian modifications of our evolutionary heritage. A polyvagal theory" (Porges, 1995).

Theory  
According to the theory, three organizational principles can be distinguished:

 Hierarchy: The autonomic nervous system reacts in three reaction patterns, which are activated in a specific order.
 Neuroception: In contrast to perception, it is here a cognition without awareness, triggered by a stimulus such as danger.
 Co-regulation: The need to feel safe enough to allow oneself to be in relationships, which is difficult for traumatized people.

When it comes to immobilization, the decisive factor for Porges is whether immobile in safety or frozen because of the feedback of danger.

Porges describes the three neural circuits as regulators for reactive behavior. His findings about the ANS were taken into account e.g. in the modern therapy of childhood trauma and are used by trauma therapists such as Bessel van der Kolk, Peter A. Levine and Marianne Bentzen. The "autonomy" of the vegetative self-regulation refers to the fact that biologically fixed, automatically running internal processes are adapted and regulated via the VNS, which can therefore not be consciously influenced directly by humans, but at most indirectly. This forms in the course of childhood and according to the suggestions of the parents or the caregivers. If the caregivers have a grown-up, developed system, then the child can also develop its resilience. However, if the caregiver is traumatized or has other impairments, the child cannot develop a stress-resistant adult nervous system.

The polyvagal theory is not simply a "theory of relaxation techniques" like autogenic training and others. According to the polyvagal theory, it is possible to strengthen a nervous system that has not yet grown up or has been dysregulated by trauma. "Pendulum exercises" can be used for this: the principle is to intentionally bring oneself out of relaxation into light stress and then back into a safe state. By oscillating between these activation states, the nervous system will be trained and will find its way back to relaxation more quickly.

Hypothesized phylogenetic subsystems/stages
The vagus nerve is a primary component of the autonomic nervous system. The polyvagal theory focuses on the structure and function of the two efferent branches of the vagus cranial nerve, both of which originate from the medulla. More specifically, each branch is claimed to be associated with a different adaptive behavioral strategy; the ventral branches are more restful in nature and the dorsal ones are more active in nature. The vagal system is claimed to be inhibitory of primal instincts by being part of the parasympathetic nervous system, and in opposition, the sympathetic-adrenal system is involved in mobilization behaviors. According to polyvagal theory, these opposing systems are phylogenetically ordered and activated for responses.

Anatomical hypothesis

The vagus, or tenth cranial nerve transmits parasympathetic signals to and from the heart, lungs, and digestive tract, a fact established before the middle of the 20th century. "Polyvagal theory" was introduced in 1994 by Stephen Porges, director of the Brain-Body Center at the University of Illinois at Chicago. As has been established since the early days of neuroanatomy, the autonomic nervous system encompasses nerve fibers transmitting information from the body toward the brain, called afferent influences. According to polyvagal theory, this effect has been observed and demonstrated by adaptive reactivity dependent on the neural circuits' phylogenetical development. Polyvagal theory claims that human facial expressions are associated with, or reflect, physical reactions, such as cardiac and digestive changes.

Porges argues this theory with observations from both evolutionary biology and neurology.

The branches of the vagal nerve are claimed to serve different evolutionary stress responses in mammals: the more primitive branch is said to elicit immobilization behaviors (e.g., feigning death), whereas the more evolved branch is said to be linked to social communication and self-soothing behaviors. These functions are claimed to follow a phylogenetic hierarchy, where the most primitive systems are activated only when the more evolved functions fail. These neural pathways regulate autonomic states and the expression of emotional and social behaviour. Thus, according to this theory, physiological state dictates the range of behaviour and psychological experience.

Polyvagal theory makes broad claims on the nature of stress, emotion, and social behaviour, for the study of which peripheral indices of arousal such as heart rate, cortisol level and skin conductance have traditionally been used. Polyvagal theory champions the measurement of vagal tone in humans as a novel index of stress vulnerability and reactivity in populations with affective disorders.

The proposed dorsal vagal complex (DVC)
The dorsal branch of the vagus nerve originates in the dorsal motor nucleus and is postulated by polyvagal theory to be the phylogenetically older branch. This branch is unmyelinated and exists in most vertebrates. Polyvagal theory calls this the "vegetative vagus" because it sees it as being associated with primal survival strategies of primitive vertebrates, reptiles, and amphibians. Under certain conditions, these animals "freeze" when threatened, conserving their metabolic resources. This draws on the simplifying claims of the triune brain theory which are no longer considered accurate due to the many exceptions to this rule (see ).

The DVC provides primary control of subdiaphragmatic visceral organs, such as the digestive tract. Under normal conditions, the DVC maintains regulation of these digestive processes. However, prolonged disinhibition can be lethal for mammals, as it results in apnea and bradycardia.

The proposed ventral vagal complex (VVC)
With increased neural complexity as seen in mammals (due to phylogenetic development) there is said to have evolved a more sophisticated system to enrich behavioral and affective responses to an increasingly complex environment. The ventral branch of the vagus originates in the nucleus ambiguus and is myelinated to provide more speed in responding. Polyvagal theory calls this the "smart vagus" because it associates it with the regulation of sympathetic "fight or flight" behaviors by way of social affiliative behaviors. These behaviors are said to include social communication and self-soothing and calming. In other words, this branch of the vagus is said to inhibit or disinhibit defensive limbic circuits, depending on the situation. Note: Attributing defensive behaviours purely to the limbic system is an oversimplification, as these are triggered by perceived threats, thus requiring an interplay of brain areas performing sensory integration, memory, and semantic knowledge with the limbic system to be elicited. Similarly, the regulation of emotions requires a complex interplay of higher cognitive areas with limbic ones.
The vagus nerve mediates the control of supradiaphragmatic visceral organs, such as the esophagus, bronchi, pharynx, and larynx. It also exerts an important influence on the heart. When vagal tone to the heart’s pacemaker is high, a baseline or resting heart rate is produced. In other words, the vagus acts as a restraint, or brake, limiting heart rate. However, when vagal tone is removed, there is little inhibition to the pacemaker, and according to polyvagal theory, rapid mobilization ("fight/flight") can be activated in times of stress, but without having to engage the sympathetic-adrenal system, as activation comes at a severe biological cost. Note: While the vagus nerve's role in downregulating the heart rate is well-established, the notion that a Fight-or-flight response can be triggered without engaging the sympathetic nervous system is not substantiated by any evidence.

Vagal tone as a physiological marker of stress
In order to maintain homeostasis, the central nervous system responds constantly, via neural feedback, to environmental cues. Stressful events disrupt the rhythmic structure of autonomic states, and subsequently, behaviors. Since the vagus plays such an integral role in the peripheral nervous system via regulation of heart rate, Porges suggests that the amplitude of respiratory sinus arrhythmia (RSA) is a good index of parasympathetic nervous system activity via the cardiac vagus. That is, RSA is proposed as a measurable, noninvasive way to see how the vagus modulates heart rate activity in response to stress. If true, this method could be useful to measure individual differences in stress reactivity.

RSA is the widely used measure of the amplitude of heart rate rhythm associated with the rate of spontaneous breathing. Research has shown that amplitude of RSA is an accurate indicator of the efferent influence of the vagus on the heart. Since inhibitory effects of the VVC branch of the vagus allow for a wide range of adaptive, prosocial behaviors, it has been theorized that individuals with greater vagal tone are able to exhibit a greater range of such behaviors. On the other hand, decreased vagal tone is associated with illnesses and medical complications that compromise the CNS. These complications may reduce one's capacity to respond to stress appropriately.

Clinical applications in the human fetus 
Healthy human fetuses have high variability in heart rate, which is mediated by the vagus. On the other hand, heart rate decelerations, which are also mediated by the vagus, are a sign of fetal distress. More specifically, prolonged withdrawal of vagal influence on the heart creates a physiological vulnerability to the influence of the Dorsal Vagal Control, which in turn produces bradycardia (very low heart rate). However, the onset of this deceleration is commonly preceded by transitory tachycardia, which is reflective of the immediate effects of Ventral Vagal Control withdrawal.

Results of Porges' theory
According to Bessel van der Kolk, professor of psychiatry at the Boston University School of Medicine: 

Others disagree with this assessment and would consider the theory an unnecessary and unsubstantiated conflict imposed on the public dialogue.

Criticism

Neuroscientific claims
Neuhuber and Berthoud (2022) state that polyvagal theory's "basic phylogenetic and functional-anatomical tenets do not withstand closer scrutiny". They argue that polyvagal theory incorrectly portrays the role of the different vagal nuclei in mediating the freeze response. According to their analysis, the evidence "does not support a role of the 'dorsal vagal complex' in freezing as proposed by the PVT (Porges, 2001)" and the dorsal vagal complex "should not be linked to passive defensive behavior".
Regarding the proposed "ventral vagal complex", they state that "the PVT, by construeing a 'new ventral vagal complex' encompassing the entire branchiomotor column ascribed to the vagus much more than it actually can serve." They see it as "misleading to propose that brainstem branchiomotor ('source') nuclei 'communicate directly with the visceromotor portion of the nucleus ambiguus' (Porges, 2001)", and conclude that the relevant networks "should not be termed 'ventral vagal complex'. This terminology may insinuate that the vagus is a "prime mover". This not the case [...]".

Taylor, Wang & Leite (2022) similarly regard it as "invalid to refer to this as a 'vagal system' or to postulate the existence of a 'smart vagus'."

Evolutionary claims
Grossman and Taylor (2007) argue that there is no evidence that the dorsal motor nucleus (DMN) is an evolutionarily more primitive center of the brainstem parasympathetic system than the nucleus ambiguus (NA), and review evidence to the contrary.

A more recent paper by Monteiro et al. (2018) finding myelinated vagus nerve fibers of lungfish leading from the nucleus ambiguus to the heart also indicates that polyvagal theory’s hypothesis that the nucleus ambiguus is unique to mammals is incorrect. They state that "the mechanisms [Porges] identifies as solely mammalian are undeniably present in the lungfish that sits at the evolutionary base of the air-breathing vertebrates."

Results reviewed by Taylor, Leite and Skovgaard (2010) also "refute the proposition that centrally controlled cardiorespiratory coupling is restricted to mammals, as propounded by the polyvagal theory of Porges".
In Taylor, Wang & Leite's 2022 review, the evidence for the presence of cardio-respiratory interactions similar to respiratory sinus arrhythmia (RSA) and their potential purpose in blood oxygenation in many vertebrate species (both air- and water-breathing) leads them to conclude that RSA may be a relic of older cardio-respiratory systems, contrary to polyvagal assumptions.

The dichotomy between asocial reptiles and social mammals assumed by polyvagal theory has been contested.

Claims regarding cardiac functioning
Polyvagal theory proposes a relationship between RSA responses and forms of psychopathology,  but a meta-analysis finds the empirical evidence to be inconclusive. 

According to Grossman and Taylor, the existing research indicates that respiratory sinus arrhythmia is not a reliable marker of vagal tone, since it is subject to both respiratory variables and sympathetic (beta-adrenergic) influences in addition to vagal influences.
They also state that they were unable to find publications documenting "[dorsal motor nucleus] effects upon mammalian vagally mediated [heart rate] during any conditions other than severe experimental irritation of the airways, extreme hypoxia, or lung congestion". In addition, they argue that the results of Porges' 2003 study on two species of lizard was flawed due to incorrect measurements of heart rate variability.

Scientific standards
In a 2021 publication, Porges states that "the theory was not proposed to be either proven or falsified". Falsifiability is a central tenet of the scientific method.

See also
 Popular psychology
 Fringe science
 Emotional dysregulation
 Fight-or-flight response
 Freezing behavior
 Tend and befriend
 Autonomic nervous system

References

Further reading
 Deb Dana: The Polyvagal Theory in Therapy, Engaging the Rhythm of Regulation (Norton Series on Interpersonal Neurobiology, Band 0), WW Norton & Co; Illustrated Edition (2018), 
 Ulrich F. Lanius, Sandra L. Paulsen, Frank M. Corrigan: Neurobiology and Treatment of Traumatic Dissociation: Towards an Embodied Self Springer Publishing Company, 2014 www.books.google.de
 S. W. Porges: The polyvagal perspective. In: Biological psychology. Band 74, Nummer 2, Februar 2007, S. 116–143, PMID 17049418,  (Review).
 Holly Bridges: Reframe Your Thinking Around Autism: How the Polyvagal Theory and Brain Plasticity Help Us Make Sense of Autism ISBN 978-1849056724 Jessica Kingsley Publishers 2015 
 Robert Bright: The Polyvagal Theory: The Simplified Guide to Understanding the Autonomic Nervous System and the Healing Power of the Vagus Nerve - Learn to Manage Emotional Stress and PTSD Through Neurobiology White Publishing Ltd 2020, ISBN 978-1-80111-968-9

External links
 The Polyvagal Theory
 The polyvagal theory: phylogenetic substrates of a social nervous system
 Stephen Porges – the originator of the Polyvagal theory.
 After 20 years of "polyvagal" hypotheses, is there any direct evidence for the first 3 premises that form the foundation of the polyvagal conjectures? Paul Grossman, University Hospital of Basle, Switzerland, on ResearchGate, with references and some discussion starting January 2016
 

Belief
Popular psychology